Dev DD is a 2017 Hindi web series, conceptualised and produced by Shobha Kapoor and Ekta Kapoor for Balaji Telefilms. It is directed by Ken Ghosh, for video on demand platform ALTBalaji. The web series released on 21 April 2017. It stars Asheema Vardaan, Sanjay Suri, Akhil Kapur, Rumana Molla, Rashmi Agdekar, and Sandeep Pandey in lead roles. This web series is a reinterpretation of the novel Devdas written by Sarat Chandra Chattopadhyay. Dev DD is about a young modern woman who is trying her best to break the concept about how Indian women are supposed to be. All the eleven episodes of this series are available on the ALTBalaji and its associated websites.

Dev DD 2 (season 2) is directed by Samar Iqbal and Harsh Dedhia. It was released on 20 February 2021 at ALTBalaji & ZEE5 digitally. It stars Sanjay Suri, Asheema Vardaan, Aman Uppal, Rashmi Agdekar, Nauheed Cyrusi, Rumana Molla, Suneel Sihna, and Deepika Amin as lead roles. Season 2 contains 17 episodes, and it is about homophobia, sexism, and feminism.

Plot 
Season 1

It is a modern Devdas in which sexism, homophobia, feminism and many more things that are refused in social societies to stress upon. The story revolves around Vicky (Asheema Vardaan), the type of girl society usually grimaces upon. She drinks, smokes, accepts how much she loves sex and a feminist from her heart. A kind of girl gets a usual label as a slut or characterless from men and some regressive women. However, she is her father's pride, and he loves his daughter the way she is. Vicky meets Paro aka Parth (Akhil Kapur), whom she falls in love with and gets heartbroken. Vicky second time fall in love with Anurag, who is matured.

Season 2

Devika's journey of discovering herself. Anurag vanishes on her in Mumbai, and a heartbroken Devika falls into depression. She is no longer craving for alcohol or drugs, she is craving for acceptance and love, but Anurag abandons her just when she needs him. Unknown to her, Chandni too is mad at her best friend for falling in love with her father. A shattered Devika wakes up in Jaipur, she doesn't know when and how she got back to her city. Her parents are distraught. There are rumours flying in the city, some believe she became a call girl, others say she was pregnant in Mumbai and others were sure that Devika is a recovering drug addict. Devika listens to them all, is regularly slut-shamed and believes that she was in the wrong. Until one day, after Anurag breaks her heart, she speaks with her father and realizes that she comes from a long line of badass women. She wasn't born to be heartbroken and sad; she was born to breathe fire. Devika picks herself up and goes back to being the woman she always was. She has a strong voice and a strident tone against societal taboos as well as for her opinions. Thus, she fights for Chandni and supports her LGBT marriage with Radha besides all odds. Her emotions find new ways with her friend, Paritosh too. At one point, her courageous outlook to move on and start finding new meaning in life can be seen. At another point, she fiercely picks up her shattered self and charges up to face the challenges again. After Anurag's death, she comes across as more strong-willed. Then, it becomes impossible for her to fall back. She joins hand with Aditi to solve the gender determination scam and exposes the real culprit behind Anurag's demise. As the season progresses, we will see Devika rediscover herself. She will learn that her worth isn't attached to a man, that she is who she is not because of the men in her life, but because of the potential she holds.  Devika Dharam Dwivedi will continue being the girl we have loved and have been in awe of. She will change but from being wilder than our imagination she will become even more kick-ass, bolder, more bindass and even more Dev DD.

Cast and characters

Episodes

Season 1

Season 2

Reception

Critical reviews 
Season 1

Anusha Iyengar of Bollywoodlife.com stated that Ekta Kapoor's version of Devdas is something you'd binge-watch over the weekend. Acting of Asheema does a great job by getting a role of an aggressive feminist and a modern girl who does as she wishes. While Akhil Kapur struggles with expressions which gets cover up by Asheema. Overall, it is recommended to all the youngster and parents to watch this web series so that they can understand the trend and their kids better.

Anvita Singh of India Today stated that Bra, booze, and expletives: Dev DD's heroine tries hard to be a rebel with a cause, but fails. They tried to hard, but failed at the end. The writers at some point made a stamp with 2-3 good instances. Overall show is watchable as an optional if you have time.

Season 2

Binged have given 5/10 stars to the second series, stating that a shorter, crisper screenplay would have made an engaging show. The acting performance of some of the cast was good and watching fun was little undercurrent which was the highlights of the show. The title music is cheery and bracing. Shreya Gupta, director of photography, has done nice work by grabbing the views and sounds of Jaipur city. On the drawbacks side, the series was too long and stretched. And overall, it is one time watchable.

References

External links 
 Dev DD at ALTBalaji
Dev DD at ZEE5 (season 2)
 

Hindi-language web series
2017 web series debuts
ALTBalaji original programming
Indian LGBT-related web series